Waldemar Kryger (born 8 November 1968 in Poznań), is a former Polish footballer who played as a defender.

He spent much of his career playing for Lech Poznań; Kryger played a total of 17 seasons for Kolejorz (from 1983–84 to 1997–98 and from 2002–03 to 2003–04) accumulating a total of 302 matches and scoring three goals. With Lech, he contributed to winning three Polish League titles in (1990, 1992 and 1993), three Polish Super Cups (1990, 1992 and 2004) plus two Polish Cups (1988 and 2004). He began his playing career at Patria Buk, playing there one season (1982–83). After 15 seasons at Lech, he moved to VfL Wolfsburg in Germany playing from 1997 to 2002. He played a total of 126 matches and scored one goal. He again returned to Poznań to play where he ended up finishing his playing career.

He played for the national team in five matches, making his debut on 14 February 1997 during a match against Lithuania. He scored his only national team goal against Latvia on 17 February 1997. After finishing his playing career, he became a coach. He worked as a coach for Czesław Michniewicz while he was the head coach of Lech Poznań. Later, Kryger decided to become a coach for the Lech Poznań Youth Teams.

References

External links

1968 births
Living people
VfL Wolfsburg players
Lech Poznań players
Bundesliga players
Footballers from Poznań
Polish footballers
Poland international footballers
Polish expatriate footballers
Expatriate footballers in Germany
Association football defenders